Darling of the Gods is a 1930 German musical drama film directed by Hanns Schwarz and starring Emil Jannings, Renate Müller and Olga Tschechowa. Jannings had recently returned from Hollywood where the arrival of sound films had harmed his career. The film was made at the Babelsburg studios, and based on the play Die Tokaier by Hans Müller. It was made by Erich Pommer's production unit, part of the German Major film studio UFA. It premiered at the Gloria-Palast in Berlin on 13 October 1930.

Plot
A selfish opera singer leaves his wife and home in Germany to travel the world's great cities. Eventually he is drawn back to his Bavarian homeland.

Cast
Emil Jannings as Albert Winkelmann
Renate Müller as Agathe
Olga Tschechowa as Olga von Dagomirska
Hans Moser as Kratochvil
Max Gülstorff as The Medizinalrat
Eduard von Winterstein as Dr. Marberg
Willy Prager as Maurus Colwyn
Siegfried Berisch as Romanones
Vladimir Sokoloff as Boris Jussupoff
Evaristo Signorini as Filipo Cardagno
Oskar Sima as Member of the Embellishment Company
Truus Van Aalten
Ethel Reese-Burns
Betty Bird
Lilian Ellerbusch
Betty Gast
Lydia Pollman
Valentine Wischnewskaja
Fritz Alberti
Luigi Bernauer
Fritz Greiner
Fritz Spira
Marcel Wittrisch

References

External links

Liebling der Götter Full movie at the Deutsche Filmothek

1930s musical drama films
German musical drama films
Films of the Weimar Republic
Films directed by Hanns Schwarz
Films about singers
Films set in Germany
Films set in Austria
Films set in South America
UFA GmbH films
German black-and-white films
Films produced by Erich Pommer
1930s biographical drama films
German biographical drama films
1930 drama films
1930s German films
Films shot at Babelsberg Studios
1930s German-language films